Aghushkash (also Romanized as Āghūshkash) is a village in Kangan Rural District, in the Central District of Jask County, Hormozgan Province, Iran. At the 2006 census, its population was 51, in 10 families.

References 

Populated places in Jask County